Yowlys Bonne Rodríguez (born November 2, 1983) is a Cuban world champion freestyle wrestler and three-time world-level medalist.

Early life
Bonne is from Guantánamo, Cuba.

Career
In 2018 Bonne became world champion by defeating Gadzhimurad Rashidov of Russia in the final match, 6-5.  Bonne is also a two-time Olympian, having competed in freestyle wrestling at both the 2012 Olympics in London and the 2016 Olympics in Rio de Janeiro.  In 2015, Bonne was eliminated from the world tournament in a controversial match.

Wrestling style
Bonne is known for an aggressive wrestling style that includes explosive throws and other eye-catching maneuvers. According to one wrestling outlet, Bonne's wrestling style "has put the phrase 'Bonne Bombs' into the wrestling lexicon."

Freestyle record

|-
! colspan="7"| World Championships & Olympic Games Matches
|-
!  Res.
!  Record
!  Opponent
!  Score
!  Date
!  Event
!  Location
|-
! style=background:white colspan=7 |
|-
|Win
|16–6
|align=left| Gadzhimurad Rashidov
|style="font-size:88%"|6-5
|style="font-size:88%" rowspan=4|October 20, 2018
|style="font-size:88%" rowspan=4|2018 World Wrestling Championships
|style="text-align:left;font-size:88%;" rowspan=4| Budapest, Hungary
|-
|Win
|15–6
|align=left| Joe Colon
|style="font-size:88%"|9-4
|-
|Win
|14–6
|align=left| Bagher Yakhkeshi
|style="font-size:88%"|Fall
|-
|Win
|13–6
|align=left| Ivan Guidea
|style="font-size:88%"|4-2
|-
! style=background:white colspan=7 |
|-
|Win
|12–6
|align=left| Rinya Nakamura
|style="font-size:88%"|Fall
|style="font-size:88%" rowspan=5|August 21, 2017
|style="font-size:88%" rowspan=5|2017 World Wrestling Championships
|style="text-align:left;font-size:88%;" rowspan=5| Paris, France
|-
|Loss
|11–6
|align=left| Haji Aliyev
|style="font-size:88%"|Fall
|-
|Win
|11–5
|align=left| Daulet Niyazbekov
|style="font-size:88%"|10-8
|-
|Win
|10-5
|align=left| Behnam Ehsanpour
|style="font-size:88%"|7-2
|-
|Win
|9-5
|align=left| Liu Minghu
|style="font-size:88%"|3-0
|-
! style=background:white colspan=7 |
|-
|Loss
|8-5
|align=left| Hassan Rahimi
|style="font-size:88%"|Fall
|style="font-size:88%" rowspan=5|August 19, 2016
|style="font-size:88%" rowspan=5|2016 Summer Olympics
|style="text-align:left;font-size:88%;" rowspan=5| Rio de Janeiro, Brazil
|-
|Win
|8-4
|align=left| Yang Kyong-il
|style="font-size:88%"|Tech Fall
|-
|Loss
|7-4
|align=left| Rei Higuchi
|style="font-size:88%"|4-8
|-
|Win
|7-3
|align=left| Adama Diatta
|style="font-size:88%"|7-4
|-
|Win
|6-3
|align=left| Abbos Rakhmonov
|style="font-size:88%"|Tech Fall
|-
! style=background:white colspan=7 |
|-
|Loss
|5-3
|align=left| Viktor Lebedev
|style="font-size:88%"|2-2
|style="font-size:88%" rowspan=2|September 12, 2015
|style="font-size:88%" rowspan=2|2015 World Wrestling Championships
|style="text-align:left;font-size:88%;" rowspan=2| Las Vegas, Nevada
|-
|Win
|5-2
|align=left| Samat Nadyrbek Uulu
|style="font-size:88%"|Tech Fall
|-
! style=background:white colspan=7 |
|-
|Win
|4-2
|align=left| Andrei Perpeliţă
|style="font-size:88%"|8-2
|style="font-size:88%" rowspan=5|September 9, 2014
|style="font-size:88%" rowspan=5|2014 World Wrestling Championships
|style="text-align:left;font-size:88%;" rowspan=5| Tashkent, Uzbekistan
|-
|Loss
|3-2
|align=left| Haji Aliyev
|style="font-size:88%"|2-4
|-
|Win
|3-1
|align=left| Aleksandr Bogomoev
|style="font-size:88%"|Tech Fall
|-
|Win
|2-1
|align=left| Rahul Mann
|style="font-size:88%"|Tech Fall
|-
|Win
|1-1
|align=left| Jean Diatta
|style="font-size:88%"|Fall
|-
|-
! style=background:white colspan=7 |
|-
|Loss
|0-1
|align=left| Kenichi Yumoto
|style="font-size:88%"|2-2, 0-2
|style="font-size:88%" rowspan=4|August 10, 2012
|style="font-size:88%" rowspan=4|2012 Summer Olympics
|style="text-align:left;font-size:88%;" rowspan=4| London, United Kingdom
|-

References

External links
 

1983 births
Living people
Olympic wrestlers of Cuba
Wrestlers at the 2012 Summer Olympics
Wrestlers at the 2016 Summer Olympics
Sportspeople from Guantánamo
Wrestlers at the 2015 Pan American Games
World Wrestling Championships medalists
Cuban male sport wrestlers
Pan American Games gold medalists for Cuba
Pan American Games medalists in wrestling
Medalists at the 2015 Pan American Games
Pan American Wrestling Championships medalists
20th-century Cuban people
21st-century Cuban people
World Wrestling Champions